Timothé Nkada Zogo (born 20 July 1999) is a French professional footballer who plays as a forward for Slovenian PrvaLiga side Koper.

Club career

Reims
On 8 August 2019, Nkada signed with Stade Reims after years in the reserve team of Rennes. He made his professional debut for Reims in a 2–0 Ligue 1 win over Lille OSC on 1 September 2019.

AaB (loan)
In August 2020, Nkada joined Danish Superliga club AaB on loan for the 2020–21 season. The loan spell was cut short on 2 May 2021, when the club announced that Nkada had returned to Reims.

International career
Born in France, Nkada is of Cameroonian descent. He was a youth international for France.

References

External links
 
 
 

1999 births
Living people
Footballers from Lille
French footballers
France youth international footballers
French sportspeople of Cameroonian descent
Association football forwards
US Lesquin players
Stade Rennais F.C. players
Stade de Reims players
AaB Fodbold players
US Orléans players
FC Koper players
Championnat National 2 players
Championnat National 3 players
Ligue 1 players
Danish Superliga players
Championnat National players

French expatriate footballers
French expatriate sportspeople in Denmark
Expatriate men's footballers in Denmark
French expatriate sportspeople in Slovenia
Expatriate footballers in Slovenia